2026 in sports describes the year's events in world sport.

Calendar by month

February

May

July

September

November

Air sports

Alpine Skiing

American football
 February 8: Super Bowl LX in TBD

Archery

Association football

FIFA World Cups
2026 FIFA World Cup (co-host  United States/ Canada/ Mexico)
2026 FIFA U-20 Women's World Cup TBA
2026 FIFA U-17 Women's World Cup TBA
2026 FIFA World Series in TBA

CONMEBOL
2026 Superclásico de las Américas in  Yokohama, Japan
 2026 Copa América Femenina in  Brazil

Club competitions
2026 Copa Libertadores TBA
2026 Copa Sudamericana TBA
2026 Recopa Sudamericana in  Doha, Qatar

AFC
2026 AFC Women's Asian Cup TBD
2026 AFC Futsal Asian Cup TBD
2026 AFC U-23 Asian Cup TBD

UEFA
 2026 UEFA Europa League Final in TBA
 2026 UEFA Women's Champions League Final in TBA
 2026 UEFA Europa Conference League Final in TBA
 2026 UEFA Champions League Final in TBA

Athletics

Aquatics

Badminton

Baseball
If the Los Angeles Dodgers are still playing in their current city, they will have been playing in Los Angeles longer than in their original home in Brooklyn.
2026 World Baseball Classic (//)

Basketball

Bowling

Boxing

Canoeing

Cheerleading

Chess

Cricket
 ICC Men's T20 World Cup in  India and  Sri Lanka
 ICC Women's T20 World Cup

Cue sports

Darts

Figure Skating

Golf

Ice Hockey

Multi-sport events
6–22 February: 2026 Winter Olympics in  Milan/Cortina d'Ampezzo, Italy
6–15 March: 2026 Winter Paralympics in  Milan/Cortina d'Ampezzo, Italy
19 September–4 October: 2026 Asian Games in  Nagoya, Japan 
17–29 March: 2026 Commonwealth Games in  Victoria, Australia
TBD: 2026 Gay Games in  Valencia, Spain
TBD: 2026 Mediterranean Games in  Taranto
TBD: 2026 Summer Youth Olympics, in  Dakar, Senegal

Rugby

References

 
Sports by year